Lutgarde Raskin is a Belgian-American scientist and Professor of Environmental Engineering.  She is best known for her studies of microbial ecology in engineered water systems for sewage treatment and drinking water production.

Raskin earned her B.S. and M.S. in engineering and her B.S. in economics from Katholieke Universiteit Leuven.  In 1993, she completed her Ph.D. at the University of Illinois.  From 1993-2005, she was a member of the faculty of the University of Illinois.  Since 2005, she has been a member of the faculty of the University of Michigan where she currently holds the Altarum Institute/ERIM Russell O’Neal Endowed Professorship.

Raskin is a Fellow of the American Academy of Microbiology (AAM) and the Water Environment Federation (WEF).  In 2006, she won the Walter  L. Huber  Civil  Engineering  Research  Prize from the American Society of Civil Engineers, in 2007, she won the Frontier Award in Research from the Association of Environmental Engineering and Science Professors, and in 2016, she won the ISME/IWA Biocluster Award. In 2021, Raskin was elected a member of the National Academy of Engineering for, "application of genetic tools to improve anaerobic biological water treatment."

Raskin has advocated for changes in the operation of drinking water treatment facilities to encourage the growth of potentially beneficial microorganisms.  In the wake of the Flint water crisis, she responded to allegations by Marc Edwards that researchers at the University of Michigan declined to collaborate on joint research of the problem.

References

External links 
Google Scholar

Environmental engineers
Living people
University of Michigan faculty
University of Illinois faculty
KU Leuven alumni
University of Illinois alumni
Year of birth missing (living people)